†Nerinea is an extinct genus of fossil sea snails, marine gastropod molluscs in the clade Heterobranchia.

Fossil record
This genus is present from the Jurassic to the Cretaceous periods. Fossils are known from various localities of Europe, Africa, North America, South America, United States, Colorado river and New Zealand.

Species 
Species in the genus Nerinea include:
 Nerinea desvoidyi D'Orbigny, 1921
 Nerinea gachupinae Alencaster, 1977
 Nerinea higoensis Shikama & Yui, 1973
 Nerinea koikensis Shikama & Yui, 1973
 Nerinea naumanni Sugiyama & Asao, 1942
 Nerinea rigida Nagao, 1934
 Nerinea schickii - from Early Cretaceous, Albian - Syria
 Nerinea shiidai Shikama & Yui, 1973
 Nerinea somaliensis Weir, 1925
 Nerinea somensis Shikama & Yui, 1973
 Nerinea sugiyamai Shikama & Yui, 1942
 Nerinea suprjurensis Voltz - from Middle Jurassic, Upper Oolite. Porrentruy, Switzerland.
 Nerinea syriaca Conrad - from Early Cretaceous, Albian - Syria

References

External links
 MNHN
 Galerie photos de fossiles

Nerineidae
Jurassic genus first appearances
Cretaceous extinctions
Prehistoric mollusc genera